The 2013–14 North Florida Ospreys men's basketball team represented the University of North Florida during the 2013–14 NCAA Division I men's basketball season. The Ospreys, led by fifth year head coach Matthew Driscoll, played their home games at the UNF Arena and were members of the Atlantic Sun Conference. They finished the season 16–16, 10–8 in A-Sun play to finish in a three way tie for fourth place. They lost in the quarterfinals of the Atlantic Sun tournament to USC Upstate.

Previous season

The Ospreys finished the 2012–13 season with an overall record of 13–19, 8–10 record in conference play. In the Atlantic Sun Conference tournament, they were defeated in the quarterfinals by Florida Gulf Coast, 73–63.

Roster

Schedule and results

|-
!colspan=9 style="background:#031B49; color:white;"| Regular season 

|-
!colspan=9 style="background:#031B49; color:white;"| Atlantic Sun tournament

References

North Florida Ospreys men's basketball seasons
North Florida
North Florida Ospreys men's basketball
North Florida Ospreys men's basketball